In organic chemistry, a group transfer reaction is a pericyclic process where one or more groups of atoms is transferred from one molecule to another. They can sometimes be difficult to identify when separate reactant molecules combine into a single product molecule (like in the ene reaction). Unlike other pericyclic reaction classes, group transfer reactions do not have a specific conversion of pi bonds into sigma bonds or vice versa, and tend to be less frequently encountered. Like all pericyclic reactions, they must obey the Woodward–Hoffmann rules.

The best known group transfer reaction is the ene reaction in which an allylic hydrogen is transferred to an alkene.

References 

Rearrangement reactions
Pericyclic reactions